Martín Adrián García Curbelo (born 26 March 1976) is a Uruguayan football forward. He played for Peñarol, Villa Española and Bella Vista of Uruguay, Club Almagro of Argentina, Pumas UNAM of Mexico and the Paraguayan side Olimpia.

García currently plays for Sportivo Luqueño of Paraguay.

In 2017, Garcia made Real España Honduran champions as manager after beating F.C. Motagua 3-2 aggregated score since 2013.

Titles

External links
 Martín García at Tenfield Digital  
 
 

1976 births
Living people
People from Pando, Uruguay
Uruguayan footballers
Peñarol players
C.A. Bella Vista players
Club Almagro players
Club Universidad Nacional footballers
Club Olimpia footballers
Sportivo Luqueño players
Expatriate footballers in Argentina
Expatriate footballers in China
Expatriate footballers in Mexico
Expatriate footballers in Paraguay
Association football forwards
Uruguayan football managers
Danubio F.C. managers
Boston River managers
Deportivo Santaní managers
Independiente F.B.C. managers
Racing Club de Montevideo managers
C.D. Marathón managers
Real C.D. España managers